Dolphin Beach Resort is situated on Alankuda beach in Kalpitiya, Sri Lanka.

Location 
Dolphin Beach Resort is located on Alankuda Beach in Illanthadiya, Kalpitiya, Sri Lanka. It is situated in the Puttalam District of North Western Province of Sri Lanka, on the Kalpitiya peninsula, approximately 18 km from Palavi Railway Station and 20 km south of Kalpitiya town. It is about 150 km (2.5 hour drive) from Colombo and 120 km (2 hour drive) from the Bandaranaike International Airport. The resort is approximately 300 km from Jaffna, 150 km from Kandy, 100 km from Anuradhapura and 90 km from Habarana.

Background 
Dolphin Beach is owned and operated by Makara Resorts (Pvt) Ltd. It was opened in late 2010 by Dallas Martenstyn, and was designed by architect Christine Wallbeoff. Much of the construction of the resort was done by the Kalpitiya community.

Facilities 
Dolphin Beach offers eco-beach accommodation that consists of air conditioned family and standard tents.

References

External links
Dolphin Beach Resort Official Site

Hotels in Puttalam District